Venkepally is a medium size village/hamlet in Nuthankal Mandal in Suryapet district of Telangana state, India. It comes under Venkepally Panchayath.It is located 26 km east of the district headquarters of Suryapet  and 150 km from the state capital Hyderabad.

This village is one of the best agriculture village and it is famous for mangoes in Suryapet dist  with more than 500 acres.

Demographics 

Telugu is the local language. Total population of Venkepally is 1606. Males are 817 and females are 789, living in 392 Houses. Total area of Venkepally is 632 hectares.

History 

Bandi Yadagiri is an Indian revolutionary poet from this village, who participated in the Telangana Rebellion of 1946–1951. He penned the famous song Bandi enka Bandi Katti against feudal lords.

References 
 http://wikimapia.org/#lang=en&lat=17.337694&lon=79.670706&z=14&m=b&show=/10141852/

 http://www.tutorgigpedia.com/ed/Bandi_Yadagiri

 "Census of India 2001: Data from the 2001 Census, including cities, villages and towns (Provisional)"  https://web.archive.org/web/20040616075334/http://www.censusindia.net/results/town.php?stad=A&state5=999. Census Commission of India. Archived from the original on 2004-06-16. Retrieved 2008-11-01.

Villages in Nalgonda district